Nilo Divina (born February 20, 1965) is a Filipino lawyer, professor, author, and educational administrator. He is the founding and managing partner of Divina Law, a law firm in the Philippines based in Makati. He is a former President of the Philippine Association of Law Schools.

In September 2021, Divina was named one of the top 100 lawyers in the Philippines by the Asia Business Law Journal. He was also named Managing Partner of the Year in the 2021 Asian Legal Business (ALB) Philippine Law Awards held in November 2021.

In 2022, Divina was named Outstanding Thomasian Alumni for Law and Justice in the University of Santo Tomas' The Outstanding Thomasian Alumni (TOTAL) Awards. He was also named Executive of the Year for the Legal Industries in the 19th Annual International Business Awards.

Education 

Divina is an alumnus of the University of Santo Tomas Faculty of Arts and Letters, graduating Bachelor of Arts in Behavioral Science with honors in 1985. He pursued law at the University of Santo Tomas Faculty of Civil Law and graduated magna cum laude as valedictorian in 1989.

Career 

Divina started as Clerk of Court at a Regional Trial Court in Pasig. In 1992, he became an associate attorney at Misa, Castro, and Associates. He was also appointed corporate secretary of the Philippine Charity Sweepstakes Office, and was promoted to General Manager and Chief Legal Adviser. In 1993, Divina started consultancy services for Equitable PCI Bank he was ultimately promoted as executive vice president, corporate secretary, and general counsel.

In 2006, Divina and another lawyer named Edwin Uy established a law firm in Makati, Philippines that would eventually be known as Divina Law Offices. From 5 lawyers when it started, the firm now has more than 80 lawyers, including those included in the list of Philippines' Top 100 Lawyers by the Asia Business Law Journal. Under Divina's leadership, the firm has been receiving many accolades. In 2021, Divina Law Offices was named a top law firm in the banking, litigation, and restructuring and insolvency in the Philippines Law Firm Awards by the Asia Business Law Journal. In 2022, the firm received a Silver Anvil Award in the 57th Anvil Awards by the Public Relations Society of the Philippines. Divina's law firm celebrated its 16th anniversary in April 2022. It has over 800 clients and handles almost 4,000 cases.

He authored the law textbook "Handbook on Philippine Commercial Law", "Questions & Answers on the Revised Corporation Code", and "Divina on Commercial Law: A Comprehensive Guide" (Volumes 1 and 2). He was also part of the board of directors of the United Coconut Planters Bank. He was appointed dean of the University of Santo Tomas Faculty of Civil Law in 2009, succeeding Roberto A. Abad who was appointed by then President Gloria Macapagal Arroyo into the Supreme Court of the Philippines as Associate Justice.

In 2023, Divina opened a restaurant called Café Aurora in Makati City with chefs Nicco Santos and Quenee Vilar as partners.

Issues

UST Hospital tax case 
UST Hospital was audited and it was discovered that there was a failure to disclose more than P700 million pesos income in 2006. Divina was the lawyer for UST Hospital when the Court of Tax Appeals of the Philippines ruled against the Bureau of Internal Revenue (Philippines) on a case involving P171.5 million in income tax and a compromise penalty of P56,000. The win of the UST hospital was due to a technicality of jurisdiction where tax assessment is invalidated because the "letter of authority" issued by the tax bureau to open the hospital's books in 2007 came from BIR Manila Region 6, but the hospital is already under the jurisdiction of the tax bureau's "Large Taxpayers Services" based in Quezon City.

Andres Bautista case 
In 2017, Philippine polls officer Andres Bautista's estranged wife pointed that Bautista is involved in corrupt practices as chairperson of the Presidential Commission on Good Government, claiming that Bautista received commissions from Divina for helping the latter's clients with the Commission on Elections (Philippines). Patricia Bautista called for Divina's disbarment. Divina countered the accusations by filing perjury and libel cases against Patricia Bautista and her lawyer Lorna Kapunan.

Horacio Castillo case 

In 2018, Horacio Castillo, III, a law student of the University of Santo Tomas Faculty of Civil Law was killed due to hazing. The fraternity Castillo was applying for is the same fraternity that Divina was a member of. He was summoned into a senate inquiry, where the line of questioning pertained to his alleged tolerance of hazing in the university, and for supposedly failing to stop the fraternity, Aegis Juris, from performing the illegal act. However, the Department of Justice (Philippines) did not find him criminally liable for the incident.

Kris Aquino case 

Divina was among the lawyers of Kris Aquino for a case against Aquino's former staff, Nicko Falcis, whom she has accused of stealing P1,270,980.31 charged using the credit card of Aquino's entertainment production company.

References 

1965 births
Living people
20th-century Filipino lawyers
21st-century Filipino lawyers
University of Santo Tomas alumni
21st-century Filipino writers
21st-century Filipino educators
Academic staff of the University of Santo Tomas